Vladimir Timofeyevich Shevyakov, in Russian Владимир Тимофеевич Шевяков  (29 October 1859, St. Petersburg – 18 October 1930, Irkutsk)  was a Russian biologist  who worked on Protozoa.

Shevyakov studied under Konstantin Mereschkowski in St. Petersburg and Otto Bütschli  at the University of Heidelberg. He was married to Lydia Kowalevsky, the youngest daughter of Alexander Kovalevsky. He was a  professor  at  St. Petersburg University until 1911 when he left science and became a vice-minister in the government of Tzar Nicholas. During the revolution he and his family moved first to Perm in Ural and in 1920 he became professor in Irkutsk.

He is mainly known for his work on Radiolaria, Ciliata and Acantharea. He described many taxa. Most of his publications are under the German spelling of his name which is Schewiakoff.

Works
 Über die karyokinetische Kerntheilung der Euglypha alveolata. "Morphologische Jahrbuch" 13, ss.  193–258 (1888)
 Man wünscht eine genaue anatomische und histologische Untersuchung der Randkörper der Meduse Charybdea mit besonderer Rücksicht auf die Augenbildungen und womöglich unter Berücksichtigung der Augen verwandter Medusen. Beiträge zur Kenntniss des Acalephenauges (1888)
 Schewiakoff W, Grassi B. Beiträge zur Kenntnis des Megastoma entericum. "Zeitschrift für wissenschaftliche Zoologie" 46, s. 143–154 + Pl. 15 (1888)
 Beiträge zur Kenntniss des Acalephenauges. "Morphologische Jahrbuch" 15, 21–60 (1889)
 Beiträge zur Kenntniss der holotrichen Ciliaten. Verlag von Theodor Fischer, Cassel 1889
 Bütschli O, Schewiakoff W. Ueber den feineren Bau der quergestreiften Muskeln von Arthropoden. "Biologisches Centralblatt" 11, 2, s. 33–39 (1891)
 Bemerkung zu der Arbeit von Professor Famintzin über Zoochlorellen. "Biologisches Centralblatt" 11, s. 475–476 (1891)
 Ueber die Geographische Verbreitung der Süsswasser-Protozoen. "Mémoires de l'Académie impériale des sciences de St. Petersbourg" VII, 41, 1–201 (1893), BHL.
 Ueber einige ekto- und entoparasitische Protozoen der Cyclopiden. "Bull. Soc. Impér. Natural. Moscou" 7, 1–29. + Pl. 1 (1893)
 Ueber einen neuen bacterienähnlichen Organismus des Susswassers. "Verhandlungen des Naturhistorisch-medizinischen Vereins zu Heidelberg" 5, s. 44–79 (1893)
 Ueber die Natur der sogenannten Exkretkörner der Infusorien. "Zeitschrift für wissenschaftliche Zoologie" 57, s. 32–56 + Pl. 3 (1894)
 Ein abnorm weiblicher Genital-Apparat von Ascaris lumbricoides L. "Centralblatt für Bakteriologie" 15 (13-14), s. 473-476 (1894)
 Ueber die Ursache der fortschreitenden Bewegung der Gregarinen. "Zeitschrift für wissenschaftliche Zoologie" 58, s. 340–354 (1894)
 A New Method of Staining Cilia, Flagella and Other Locomotor Organs of Protozoa. "Proceedings of the Fourth International Congress of Zoology" Cambridge 1898
 К биологии простейших. "Записки Императорской Академии Наук" том 75
 Организация и систематизация Infusoria Aspirotricha. "Mémoires de l'Académie impériale des sciences de St. Petersbourg" VIII, 4, 1–395
 The structure and classification of the infusoria Aspirotricha (Holotricha auctorum) by W. Schewiakoff. Trans. by Prudence Winter Kofoid (1903)
 Beiträge zur Kenntniss der Radiolaria-Acanthometrea. "Mémoires de l'Académie impériale des sciences de St. Petersbourg" 12, 10 (1902)
 Acantharia. Fauna e Flora del golfo di Napoli. 2 vol. Stazione Zoologica di Napoli, monogr. No. 37, 1–755 (1896)
 Acantharia des Golfes von Neapel [w:] Fauna and Flora des Golfes von Neapel Monographie, Friedländer & Sohn, Berlin 1926

References
Władimir Szewiakow :pl:Władimir Szewiakow

External links

 Professor W. T. Schewiakoff: Life and Science
EOL Encyclopedia of Life Taxa described by Schewiakoff.Some images. Type Schewiakoff into search box.
Biographical Etymology of Marine Organism Names

Russian zoologists
1859 births
1930 deaths